Rawnak Hasan is a Bangladeshi actor, director and playwright. He won the Meril Prothom Alo Best Actor Critic Award for the telefilm Ratargul (2014) He is the general secretary of the Actors Equity.

Career 
At the age of eighteen, Rawnak joined a theatre group called Theatre Art Nattayadol in the year of 1995. This was the beginning of his acting career when he realized that real acting is performed in theatres. He debuted in a play called Prohelika but his character had no dialogue. He performed in a number of plays like ‘Court Marshal’, Kallattar, Hingtingchot, and Kaataa as a member of theatre Art Nattayadol till 1999. 

Later on, he joined another theatre group called ‘Nattayajon’ where he worked for few months. In the same year, he joined the theatre group Nagarik Nattaya Shampraday.

Hasan made his first television appearance in a drama serial called Kagojer Phool. In 2004, his first written screenplay for a drama serial Boyosh Jokhon Ekush, was premiered. He debuted as a director in 2004 by directing a television drama called Tomatei.

On 28 January 2022, Hasan became the general secretary of the Actors Equity for 2022–25 term after receiving 421 votes.

Works
Scriptwriter

Theatre actor

Television actor

Web series

References

Living people
Bangladeshi male television actors
Bangladeshi male film actors
Bangladeshi male stage actors
Date of birth missing (living people)
Place of birth missing (living people)
Year of birth missing (living people)